Lynn Cominsky is an American astrophysicist and educator. She is currently the Chair of Astronomy and Physics at Sonoma State University in Rohnert Park, California, as well as the Project Director for the NASA Education and Public Outreach Group.

Early career 
Cominsky began her undergraduate studies at Brandeis University in 1971, where she originally majored in psychology. After being asked to dissect a cat's brain in her first college course, she changed majors and began studying physical sciences. Cominsky obtained a B.A. in Physics with honors in Chemistry, and graduated magna cum laude. She researched with Irving Epstein on the Belusov oscillating reaction. After graduating, she worked at the Center for Astrophysics  Harvard & Smithsonian, where she began analyzing data from X-ray astronomy satellites beginning with the UHURU satellite (and helping to compile the 4U catalog), prior to attending graduate school. While a graduate student at M. I. T., and using data from the SAS-3 satellite, she discovered X-ray pulsations from 4U0115+63 (together with George Clark); these pulsations were then used to show that transient X-ray. sources were in binary systems. Her thesis work with Walter Lewin and Paul Joss, was entitled "X-ray Burst Sources" and consisted of extensive analysis of the SAS-3 timing and spectral data, as well as theoretical thermonuclear flash modeling. During a post-doctoral fellowship at UC Berkeley Space Sciences Laboratory, and using a combination of SAS-3 and HEAO A-1 data, she (and Kent Wood) discovered the 7.1 h X-ray binary period and the first eclipses from an X-ray burst source, MXB1659-29. Another highlight of Cominsky's research career was the discovery of X-ray emission from the first radio pulsar found to be in a binary orbit with a Be star, PSR 1259-63.

For two years following her post-doctoral work at UC Berkeley, Cominsky managed various aspects of Stuart Bowyer's Extreme UltraViolet Explorer Satellite project, including the design of the science operations and ground data analysis system.

Sonoma State University 
Cominsky joined the faculty at Sonoma State University in 1986, where she is now Professor of Physics and Astronomy. She has been Chair of the Physics and Astronomy Department since 2004; she briefly chaired also the Department of Chemistry from August 2005 to January 2007. In 1992, Cominsky began a collaboration with scientists (including Elliott Bloom) at the Stanford Linear Accelerator Center (SLAC), which led directly to her involvement in the Gamma-ray Large Area Space Telescope (GLAST) project.

Cominsky founded the Education and Public Outreach group at Sonoma State University in 1999 and is the Project Director, Principal Investigator on over $17 million in grants and final technical reviewer for all products. She is also co-principal investigator on additional $5 million in federal grants. The mission of the SSU E/PO group is to develop exciting formal and informal educational materials to inspire students in grades 5–14 to pursue STEM careers, to train teachers nationwide in the classroom use of these materials, and to enhance science literacy for the general public.

The SSU E/PO group's largest NASA-funded project was the Education and Public Outreach program for the Fermi Gamma-ray Space Telescope mission. Launched on June 11, 2008, Fermi (formerly known as GLAST) is a space mission that uses silicon strip detectors to observe cosmic gamma-radiation from objects such as pulsars and quasars in the energy range 10 MeV - 300 GeV. Cominsky's group also led the Education and Public Outreach team for the Swift Gamma-Ray Burst Mission, launched on November 20, 2004. In 2003, Cominsky assumed the lead for the outreach effort for the US portion of the European Space Agency's XMM-Newton satellite. From 1999–2005, Cominsky was also the Principal Investigator and Faculty Advisor for the North Bay Science Project, a California Science Project site located at SSU. Other major projects developed by the SSU E/PO group include an online Cosmology curriculum for undergraduates, and an innovative curriculum for secondary students to build small payloads for launch on high-powered rockets and balloons. Cominsky is also a scientific co-investigator on the Fermi, Swift NuSTAR missions, and a member of the LIGO Scientific Collaboration. From 2012–2014, the SSU E/PO group developed an educator's guide for the NuSTAR mission.

Starting in 2013, and in partnership with SSU's Early Academic Outreach program led by Susan Wandling, Cominsky's group began to develop a two-year high school curriculum called "Learning by Making." This five-year project is one of 18 funded by the U.S. Department of Education's Investing in Innovation program for 2013. The curriculum is currently being piloted with six high-needs rural high schools in Mendocino county. The group's newest NSF project "Teaching Einstein's Universe to Community College students" has developed an on-line course to educate lower-division physics instructors about the science of LIGO. These courses also provide resources for instructors to use in their calculus-based introductory physics classes.

Cominsky has been a member of many different advisory committees, including the Chandra User's Group, the Structure and Evolution of the Universe Subcommittee of NASA's Space Sciences Advisory Committee, and the LIGO Program Advisory Committee. She has served on the Executive committees for the High Energy Astrophysics Division of the American Astronomical Society, and for the Division of Astrophysics of the American Physical Society. Currently she is also Chair of the APS California Section. For a decade, she was the Deputy Press Officer for the American Astronomical Society, and she continues as the Press Officer for both the Fermi and Swift missions. In these positions, she often interprets astronomical discoveries to the public.

Honors and awards
In 1993, Cominsky was named both SSU Outstanding Professor and California Professor of the Year by the Council for the Advancement and Support of Education (CASE). In 2008, Cominsky was named a Fellow of the California Council on Science and Technology, in 2009, she was named a Fellow of the American Physical Society (Education) and in 2013, she was named a Fellow of the American Association for the Advancement of Science (Astronomy). Recent awards include the 2014 Aerospace Awareness award from the Women in Aerospace professional organization, the 2015 Sally Ride Excellence in Education award from the American Astronautical Society and the 2016 Education prize from the American Astronomical Society.

Cominsky also was named the 2016 awardee of the Wang Family Excellence Award from the California State University system, in the category of Natural Sciences, Mathematical and Computer Sciences and Engineering.

She was elected a Legacy Fellow of the American Astronomical Society in 2020.

References 

21st-century American physicists
Year of birth missing (living people)
Living people
Sonoma State University faculty
Brandeis University alumni
Massachusetts Institute of Technology alumni
American women physicists
Fellows of the American Physical Society
Fellows of the American Astronomical Society
21st-century American women